The 16th Annual Tony Awards took place on April 29, 1962, in the Waldorf-Astoria Grand Ballroom in New York City. The ceremony was broadcast on local television station WCBS-TV (Channel 2) in New York City. The Masters of Ceremonies were Ray Bolger and Robert Preston.

The ceremony
Presenters: Judith Anderson, Art Carney, Ossie Davis, Ruby Dee, Olivia de Havilland, Albert Dekker, Anita Gillette, Hermione Gingold, Robert Goulet, Helen Hayes, Celeste Holm, Sally Ann Howes, Ron Husman, Hal March, Helen Menken, Geraldine Page, Hugh O'Brian, Elaine Perry, Tom Poston and Jason Robards. The performer was Mimi Benzell. Music was by Meyer Davis and his Orchestra.

Winners and nominees
Winners are in bold

Multiple nominations and awards

These productions had multiple nominations:

9 nominations: No Strings   
8 nominations: How to Succeed in Business Without Really Trying  
7 nominations: Carnival!  
5 nominations: Milk and Honey 
4 nominations: The Gay Life, Gideon, A Man for All Seasons and Ross  
3 nominations: The Caretaker, The Night of the Iguana, Kwamina and Subways Are for Sleeping  
2 nominations: All American, From the Second City, Great Day in the Morning, Kean, A Passage to India and Sail Away

The following productions received multiple awards.

7 wins: How to Succeed in Business Without Really Trying  
4 wins: A Man for All Seasons 
3 wins: No Strings  
2 wins: Carnival!

References

External links
 Tony Awards official site

Tony Awards ceremonies
1962 in theatre
1962 awards
1962 in the United States
1962 in New York City
1962 awards in the United States
April 1962 events in the United States